Amplitempora captiocula is a species of beetle in the family Cerambycidae, and the only species in the genus Amplitempora. It was described by Giesbert in 1996.

References

Lamiinae
Beetles described in 1996